The Orlando Police Department (OPD) is responsible for law enforcement within the city limits of Orlando, Florida. The OPD employs over 800 sworn officers and over 150 civilian employees serving the citizens of Orlando through crime prevention, criminal investigations, and apprehension, neighborhood policing, involvement through the schools with young people and overall delivery of police services.

The current Chief of Police is Eric Smith. In May of 2022, Mayor of Orlando Buddy Dyer announced that deputy chief Eric Smith would become chief in November.

History
In the 1960s, the OPD ran a firearm training program for women, in response to increased rates of rape.

Jerry Demings became the OPD's first African-American chief in 1998, and served until 2002.

The police department has managed, along with local radio program The Monsters in the Morning on WTKS-FM, a "no questions asked" gun exchange for gift cards or sports shoes.  In August, 2007, a man turned in an item first identified as a rocket launcher resulting in international publicity. The item was later determined to be an empty carrying case for a TOW missile and its launcher.

Orlando's first female police chief, Val Demings, was appointed in 2007. Her husband and former police chief Jerry was elected  Sheriff of Orange County in 2008: his opponent mentioned his wife's position as a potential conflict of interest. Violent crime in Orlando decreased drastically during her tenure as chief. Demings retired on June 1, 2011. 

A 2008 Orlando Weekly exposé described the Orlando Police Department as "a place where rogue cops operate with impunity, and there's nothing anybody who finds himself at the wrong end of their short fuse can do about it." A 2015 article about Val Deming's congressional campaign in The Atlantic stated that the Orlando Police Department "has a long record of excessive-force allegations, and a lack of transparency on the subject, dating back at least as far as Demings's time as chief."  Demings responded with an op-ed in the Orlando Sentinel, writing, "Looking for a negative story in a police department is like looking for a prayer at church", adding, "It won't take long to find one." In the same op-ed, she cast doubt on video evidence that conflicts with officers' statements in excessive force cases, writing, "a few seconds (even of video) rarely capture the entire set of circumstances."

In 2010, an Orlando police officer flipped 84-year-old World War II veteran Daniel Daley over his shoulder after the man became belligerent, throwing him to the ground and breaking a vertebra in his neck. Daley alleged excessive force and filed a lawsuit. The police department cleared the officer as "justified" in using a "hard take down" to arrest Daley, concluding he used the technique correctly even though he and the other officer made conflicting statements. Demings said "the officer performed the technique within department guidelines" but also that her department had "begun the process of reviewing the use of force policy and will make appropriate modifications." A federal jury ruled in Daley's favor and awarded him $880,000 in damages.

John W. Mina was chief of police from 2014 to 2018. The OPD together with the Orange County Sheriff's Office responded to the Orlando nightclub shooting in 2016. An OPD officer ultimately shot and killed shooter Omar Mateen after he fired on the responding officers. 

In 2017, Master Sgt. Debra Clayton was shot and killed by a man who was wanted in the death of his pregnant ex-girlfriend. A deputy of the sheriff's office also died in the ensuing pursuit of the suspect.

In 2019, an Orlando Police officer arrested a 6-year-old girl after she kicked a school staff member during a tantrum, and a 6-year-old boy later that same day. The officer was terminated.

In 2022, the OPD was kicked out of the Active Bystandership for Law Enforcement (ABLE) training program after an instructor wrote to ABLE stating that officers were not taking the full eight hours of the class.

Since the establishment of the Orlando Police Department, 15 officers have died in the line of duty.

Academy
Through a joint effort with other local agencies and Valencia College, uncertified newly hired officers attend a 22-week academy at the Criminal Justice Institute at VCC.

Organization

Specialized units 
OPD operates a wide range of specialized enforcement units including:
 Traffic Enforcement
 Mounted Patrol (Horses)
 Criminal Investigation Units
 Marine Patrol
 Airport Division (Orlando International Airport)
 Bike Unit
 K-9 Unit
 Gang Unit
 SWAT
 International Drive Team
 DUI Enforcement Team
 Taxi Cab Code Enforcement Team

See also

List of U.S. state and local law enforcement agencies
List of law enforcement agencies in Florida

References

External links
 

Government of Orlando, Florida
Municipal police departments of Florida
Organizations established in 1875
1875 establishments in Florida